Aegires malinus is a species of sea slug. It is a dorid nudibranch, a shell-less marine gastropod mollusc in the family Aegiridae.

Distribution 
This species was described from Bebbit, Batangas Region, Philippines. It has also been reported from Okinawa, Japan.

References

Aegiridae
Gastropods described in 2004